Uwang Ahadas is a Filipino folk musician of the Yakan people who is a recipient of the National Living Treasures Award.

Background
Uwang Ahadas was born on February 16, 1945.
He went near blind when he was five years old. People in his community believed that this was due to retribution of nature spirits which lived in Bohe Libaken, a creek where Ahadas frequently bathe in. Ahadas along with his siblings musicians were taught how to play Yakan traditional instruments as children. He first learned how to play the gabbang, a wooden bamboo instrument similar to the xylophone then learned how to play the agung an instrument traditionally played by Yakan men.

By age 20, Ahadas had already mastered the kwintangan which is considered as the most important Yakan musical instrument despite the instrument traditionally reserved for women. He can also play the tuntungan.

He taught his children how to play Yakan traditional instruments, including Darna who would later become a teacher of these traditions herself. Ahadas went on to promote these traditions outside his native town of Lamitan, Basilan.

Ahadas was recognized as a National Living Treasure by the National Commission for Culture and the Arts in the year 2000.

References

1945 births
Living people
National Living Treasures of the Philippines
20th-century Filipino musicians
21st-century Filipino musicians
Filipino multi-instrumentalists
Filipino traditional musicians
Filipino Muslims
Musicians from Basilan